Jesús María is a municipality in the Mexican state of Aguascalientes. As of 2010, the municipality had a total population of 99,590.

History

Geography
The municipality has an area of 499.18 km² (192.73 sq mi).

Major highways
 Mexican Federal Highway 70

Adjacent municipalities
San José de Garcia Municipality (north)
Pabellón de Arteaga Municipality (north)
San Francisco de los Romo Municipality (east)
Aguascalientes Municipality (southeast)
Calvillo Municipality (west)

Demographics

As of 2010, the city of Jesús María, the municipal seat, had a population of 43,012. Other than the city of Jesús María, the municipality had 346 localities, the largest of which (with 2010 populations in parentheses) were: Jesús Gómez Portugal (Margaritas) (11,589), Paseos de Aguascalientes (4,432), Arboledas Paso Blanco (3,313), Corral de Barrancos (3,158), El Llano (2,571), classified as urban, and Maravillas (2,208), Paso Blanco (1,709), Tepetates (1,683), General Ignacio Zaragoza (Venadero) (1,630), Paseos de las Haciendas (1,596), Valladolid (1,411), San Antonio de los Horcones (1,254), Los Arquitos (1,120), Miravalle (1,071), and Ejido la Guayana (Rancho Seco) (1,028), classified as rural.

References

Link to tables of population data from Census of 2005 Instituto Nacional de Estadística, Geografía e Informática (INEGI)
Aguascalientes Enciclopedia de los Municipios de México

External links
Municipio de Jesús María Official website
Gobierno del Estado de Aguascalientes Official website of state of Aguascalientes

Municipalities of Aguascalientes

eo:Jesús María (komunumo)
it:Jesús María